Kengis is a small rural community in Pajala Municipality in northernmost Sweden, located very near the Finnish border.

History
In 1644, two Swedish noblemen, later called Renstierna ("Reindeer star"), set up a forge in the Swedish village Pajala (Finnish for "forge village") north of the Arctic Circle. As Sweden at that time was very eager to mint all the copper found in the country, they also got a concession for minting. Renstiernas minted both plate money and minor local coins in values of 5, 10, 15 and 20 öre.

References 

Norrbotten
Numismatics
Populated places in Pajala Municipality